Claude Lefebvre (born February 20, 1964) is a Canadian former ice hockey player who is currently an assistant coach for the Quebec Remparts in the QMJHL.

Awards and honours

References

External links

1964 births
Living people
Canadian ice hockey forwards
French Quebecers
Ice hockey people from Quebec City
Moncton Golden Flames players
Quebec Remparts players
HC Gardena players
Ducs d'Angers players
Whitley Warriors players
Canadian expatriate ice hockey players in France
Canadian expatriate ice hockey players in Switzerland
Canadian expatriate ice hockey players in Austria
Canadian expatriate ice hockey players in Italy
Canadian expatriate ice hockey players in England
Canadian ice hockey coaches